Rasoul Khadem Azghadi (born March 18, 1972) is a former Iranian wrestler who has won a bronze medal in the 1992 Summer Olympics and a gold medal in the 1996 Summer Olympics. He was also the 1994 and 1995 world champion and the 1991, 1992, 1993, 1994, 1995 and 1996 Asian champion. He was trained by his father Mohammad Khadem, and he is also the younger brother of Olympic wrestling bronze medalist Amir Reza Khadem and ebrahim khadem.

He was the president of Islamic Republic of Iran Wrestling Federation from January 4, 2014, to November 3, 2018. He was also the technical director of Iran's wrestling national teams and head coach of Iran's freestyle wrestling national team from January 2012 to 2018. In addition, he was elected as executive board member of National Olympic Committee of Iran on January 20, 2014, and served until January 2018.

Major achievements
 Junior World Championship –  1991  1989
 World Championships –  1994 1995  1998
 Olympic Games -  1996  1992

References
 Profile at FILA Wrestling Database
  biography

1972 births
Living people
Sportspeople from Mashhad
Olympic wrestlers of Iran
Olympic gold medalists for Iran
Olympic bronze medalists for Iran
Wrestlers at the 1992 Summer Olympics
Wrestlers at the 1996 Summer Olympics
Iranian male sport wrestlers
Asian Games gold medalists for Iran
Asian Games silver medalists for Iran
Olympic medalists in wrestling
Iranian sportsperson-politicians
Asian Games medalists in wrestling
Wrestlers at the 1990 Asian Games
Wrestlers at the 1994 Asian Games
World Wrestling Championships medalists
Medalists at the 1996 Summer Olympics
Medalists at the 1992 Summer Olympics
Medalists at the 1990 Asian Games
Medalists at the 1994 Asian Games
Tehran Councillors 2007–2013
Tehran Councillors 2003–2007
Recipients of the Order of Courage (Iran)
Asian Wrestling Championships medalists
20th-century Iranian people
21st-century Iranian people
World Wrestling Champions